Khanyisile Mbau born 15 October 1985 known professionally as Khanyi Mbau, is a South African actress, musician, television presenter and socialite. Raised in Soweto, Mbau received recognition as the second Doobsie in the 1997 SABC 2 soap opera Muvhango (2004–2005); as Mbali in the SABC 1 soap opera Mzansi and SABC 1's mini-series After Nine. As of 2018, she is the host of the SABC 3 entertainment show The Scoop and The Big Secret on BET Africa, and plays Tshidi on Mzansi Magic's Abomama. the artist that give South Africans the hit Songs Dunusa and Iskhokho sidla amagwinya

Early life
Khanyisile Mbau was born on 16 October 1985. Her mother, Lynette Sisi Mbau, worked in the finance department of the pension fund at Barclays Bank. Her father, Menzi Mcunu, was not married to her mother at the time as the couple were only dating. Mcunu had no claim to the child but he named her nevertheless: Khanyisile, one who brings light. Mbau kept her mother's surname. Lynette soon left baby Khanyi with her parents in Mofolo, Soweto and returned to work, leaving her grandmother virtually raising her.

Mbau's grandparents were very Western in the way they dressed and saw the world. Mbau said, "Gladys (her grandmother) would cane you if you broke the rules. She ran her household with the decorum and attention to detail of Buckingham Palace".

Career

Television
In 2004, Mbau replaced actress Lindiwe Chibi in the role of Doobsie on Muvhango after Chibi was shot by her boyfriend Dan Mokoena. A year later she was fired from the role, reportedly for spending too much time partying and appearing in the Sunday tabloids. In 2006 Mbau joined the SABC 1 hit drama series Mzansi, in its second season, as Mbali. SABC 1 did not renew the show for a third season. Later in 2007 Mbau played the role of Zee in the SABC 1 mini-series After 9.

In 2012 she was the guest judge on the second season of SABC 1's Turn It Out. In 2013 she starred in an episode of E.tv's anthology drama series, Ekasi: Our Stories. She also featured in the DStv Vuzu documentary, I Am, and she portrayed Sindisiwe Sibeko on DStv's Mzansi Magic mini-series Like Father Like Son.

In August 2012, Mbau released her biography Bitch, Please! I’m Khanyi Mbau, written by the journalist Lesley Mofokeng.

In 2013 Mbau featured in the docu-reality television series Reality Check on E.tv. In the same year, Mbau began hosting her own talk show on the OpenView HD channel eKasi+, Katch It With Khanyi. The show was renewed for a second season in late 2014. It reached number one in audience share for talk shows, exceeding the share of SABC 2's Motswako. Katch It With Khanyi debuted with a viewership of 785,000 viewers, which increased to 1,669,000 in the first week of November 2014. During the show's second season, it was nominated for the South African Film and Television Awards 2015.

In 2014, Mbau competed in the seventh season of Strictly Come Dancing. In week 7 she and partner Quintus Jansen failed to earn enough votes to remain in the competition, and she was eliminated. There was an initial controversy on social media as super-fans of Mbau expressed their disappointment and questioned the integrity of the voting process. In July 2015, MTV Africa launched lip sync battles, with Mbau taking the award home.

In April 2015, Mbau landed the supporting role of "Pinky" in E.tv's first-ever telenovela, Ashes to Ashes. In November 2015, she was nominated for "Best Instagram Account" in the Channel24 Online Awards, which honored local musicians, stars and public figures who have a powerful and influential online presence.

In March 2016, Mbau landed the role of Palesa Simelane in the hit television drama series Umlilo; the character was a closet lesbian state prosecutor who entered into a polygamous marriage, and her sole purpose was to produce children. In July 2016, Mbau landed a new television show on SABC 3 called The Weekend Edition alongside radio and TV host Phat Joe. The duo hosted the lifestyle show on weekend mornings, filmed in Cape Town.

In July 2017, Mbau appeared in a new entertainment show titled The Scoop which aired on SABC 3 as part of the channel's new lineup. In September 2017, BET Africa channel announced a new 13-part reality series titled The Big Secret, hosted by Mbau. In the series, she gets participants to reveal their darkest secrets. The show aired to air on October 25, 2017 and ended with a two-part reunion episode.

In March 2018, Mbau joined the cast of South Africa's most watched TV show, Uzalo, on SABC 1, portraying the role of go-getter Dinekile aka Lady Die who is a shoplifter by trade and aspires for a life like her cousin MaNgcobo. Having done short stints in jail for petty crimes and knows her way around the underworld, she has not achieved what she wants yet. In July 2019, Mbau announced her return to the show for its 5th season. In April 2018, Mzansi Magic released a trailer for their new drama series, Abomama, which examines and challenges the ideas of faith and sin. Mbau takes the lead role playing Tshidi, an approval-seeking former ghetto queen turned suburban wife who is married to a reputable doctor played by Leroy Gopal. The show debuted with over a million viewers, making it the third most watched show on DSTV.

Radio
In 2016, Mbau became the host of a radio show on Metro FM, Whose show is it anyway, alongside entertainers Somizi Mhlongo and Ntombi Ngcobo. The show premiered nationally on July 18, 2016, and ran for a year until it came to an end in the reshuffle of the station.

Film
Mbau's first feature film, Happiness is a Four-letter Word, premiered on February 19, 2016. She played the role of Zaza, trophy wife to Bheki (Simo Magwaza), mother of two, and owner of a shoe store. The film premiered with box office-smashing numbers and continued with gross box office receipts over R7 million in its third week on the cinema circuit. In October 2016, the Johannesburg Film Festival named Mbau among their top 10 South African actresses in film, following the success of Happiness Is a Four-letter Word.

Mbau's second film, a thriller titled The Red Room, was set for cinema release in 2018.

In 2017, Mbau began production of her third film with filmmaker and comedian Leon Schuster, Frank and Fearless, which was set for cinema release in 2018.

Business ventures
In November 2018, Mbau announced the launch of her own brand of gin called I Am Khanyi - Millennial Shimmer Gin.

Filmography

References

External links

Living people
People from Soweto
South African film actresses
21st-century South African actresses
South African television personalities
1985 births